Andrew Carmellini is an American chef and restaurateur. Carmellini is responsible for the food and drink at the 15 restaurants, bars and food stands he owns with his partners at NoHo Hospitality. He has received a place on Food & Wine’s Best New Chefs list, James Beard Rising Star Chef and Best Chef New York awards, and a Michelin star. He is the author of two cookbooks.

Career
Carmellini began his cooking career at age 14 in his hometown of Seven Hills, Ohio. After a stint at San Domenico in New York City, Carmellini honed worked at restaurants in Europe, including Valentino Marcatili's two-star Michelin restaurant San Domenico in Emilia–Romagna, Gualtiero Marchesi di San Pietro all'Orto in Milan and Arpège in Paris. In New York, Carmellini spent four years on Gray Kunz's New York Times four-star team at Lespinasse and served as sous chef at Le Cirque.

Carmellini worked as chef de cuisine at Café Boulud, where he earned three stars from The New York Times, won The James Beard Foundation's Best New Chef and Best Chef: New York awards and was named to Food & Wine’s Best New Chefs roster. As chef at A Voce, he earned a three-star New York Times review and a Michelin star.

In 2009, Carmellini opened Locanda Verde, a Tribeca Italian taverna, in Robert de Niro’s Greenwich Hotel with partners Luke Ostrom and Josh Pickard.

Current restaurants
 Carne Mare, a Nashville Italian chophouse
 Locanda Verde, a Tribeca Italian taverna
 The Dutch, an American bistro in SoHo, NYC, a New York Times Restaurant of the Year
 Lafayette, a French grand café in NoHo, NYC
 Joe’s Pub, a live music venue & The Library at the Public, a restaurant at The Public Theater in New York’s East Village
 Bar Primi, a pasta-focused restaurant in New York’s East Village and a Michelin Guide Bib Gourmand
 Leuca, a southern Italian restaurant in Brooklyn
 Westlight, a rooftop bar on the 22nd floor of The William Vale in Brooklyn
 Mister Dips, offering burgers at locations in NYC and Detroit
 Rec Pier Chop House at the Sagamore Pendry Hotel in Baltimore
 Rye Street Tavern, an American eatery in the Port Covington section of Baltimore
 At the Shinola Hotel in Detroit: San Morello, a Southern Italian restaurant, the cocktail lounge Evening Bar, The Brakeman beer hall, and Penny, Red’s, a fried-chicken joint

Cookbooks
With his wife, Gwen Hyman, Carmellini is the author of two books of recipes and stories: Urban Italian, and American Flavor.

References

External links
 

Living people
Year of birth missing (living people)
American people of Italian descent
American chefs
American male chefs
American food writers
Writers from New York (state)
Culinary Institute of America alumni
People from Seven Hills, Ohio
James Beard Foundation Award winners